An esophageal motility disorder (EMD) is any medical disorder causing difficulty in swallowing, regurgitation of food and a spasm-type pain which can be brought on by an allergic reaction to certain foods. The most prominent one is dysphagia.

Esophageal motility disorder may be a result of CREST syndrome, referring to the five main features: calcinosis, Raynaud syndrome, esophageal dysmotility, sclerodactyly and telangiectasia.

Symptoms
Symptoms of EMD can include chest pain, and intermittent dysphagia for solids, liquids, or both, and regurgitation. Contractions along the lower esophagus prevent the passage of food.

Types
Dysphagia could be for solids only, or for solids and liquids both.
 Solid dysphagia is due to obstructions such as esophageal cancer, esophageal webs, or stricture.
 Solid-and-liquid dysphagia is due to an esophageal motility disorder (or dysmotility) either in the upper esophagus (caused by, for example, myasthenia gravis, stroke, or dermatomyositis) or the lower esophagus (where causes include systemic sclerosis, CREST syndrome, or achalasia).
The most common form of dysphagia is achalasia, which is caused by degeneration of the nerves in the esophagus. This causes the muscles to stop working and prevents the valve at the bottom of the esophagus from being able to open properly.

If there is a food allergy causing the dysmotility disorder, then physicians recommend an elimination diet. If this fails, then physicians will prescribe medication.

Diagnostics 
Testing to diagnose EMD includes barium esophagography, upper endoscopy, and esophageal manometry.

Treatments 

There is no cure for EMD, but symptoms can be managed. Some symptom management includes eating slower and taking smaller bites; in some cases medications can be useful to manage other issues that contribute to EMD such as a proton pump inhibitor to ease gastroesophageal reflux (acid reflux), or a smooth muscle relaxant for issues with the muscles.

See also

 Esophageal disease
 Esophageal motility study
 Esophageal spasm
 GERD
 Nutcracker esophagus
 Esophagogastric junction outflow obstruction
 Systemic sclerosis
 Esophageal food bolus obstruction
 Dysphagia
 Functional Lumen Imaging Probe

References

External links 

Diseases of oesophagus, stomach and duodenum
Esophagus disorders